María José Pueyo Bergua (born March 16, 1970 in Jaca, Huesca) is a Spanish marathon runner. At age thirty-eight, Pueyo made her official debut for the 2008 Summer Olympics in Beijing, where she competed in the women's marathon, along with her compatriots Alessandra Aguilar and Cuban-born Yesenia Centeno. She finished the race in sixty-fourth place by thirty-one seconds ahead of Hungary's Petra Teveli, with a time of 2:48:01.

References

External links

NBC 2008 Olympics profile

Spanish female marathon runners
Living people
Olympic athletes of Spain
Athletes (track and field) at the 2008 Summer Olympics
People from Jaca
Sportspeople from the Province of Huesca
1970 births